Ciamis Regency (Indonesian: Kabupaten Ciamis,) is a landlocked regency in West Java, Indonesia, and shares a provincial border with Central Java.  Its seat is the town of Ciamis, also the primary urban center.  Formerly, the regency included areas bordering the Indian Ocean, but these southern districts were cut off to form a separate Pangandaran Regency in 2012. The regency now covers 1,536.84 km2, and had a 2020 census population of 1,229,070, but the official estimate as at mid 2021 was 1,430,262.

Recent changes
Prior to the separation of part of this regency in 2012, it had an area of 2,556.75 km2 and population of 1,528,306 (at the 2010 census); the regency was until 2012 divided into 36 districts.  However, as from 25 October 2012, the existing regency has been split, with 10 districts comprising the southern portion being formed into a new Pangandaran Regency (with a 2010 census population of 383,848), leaving 26 districts in the residual Ciamis Regency, which however is smaller in area than Pangandaran Regency. The reduced Ciamis Regency covers 1,433.87 km2 and the districts comprising it had a population of 1,148,656 at the 2010 census, which rose to 1,229,070 at the 2020 census and to an official estimate of 1,430,262 as at mid 2021.

Tourist destinations
In 2011 Ciamis Regency was boosting the (new) tourist destinations with an idea of making a new Regency in the southern 10 districts of the regency, where there were already several tourist destinations (e.g. Pangandaran Beach). The separate Pangandaran Regency was split off in 2012.

In the five months up to end of May 2014, Ciamis Regency was only visited by 156,423 domestic tourists and just 3 foreign tourists as a spill-off from Pangandaran Beach. The low count was a significant drop compared to when Pangandaran was still part of Ciamis Regency, because Ciamis Regency until now has not yet arranged affordable tourist sites, mainly for foreign tourists.

A number of artistic and tourist attractions are located in the town of Ciamis Regency.

Administrative districts
Prior to the separation of Pangandaran Regency as a separate regency, there were 36 districts (kecamatan) within Ciamis Regency. Six of these districts (Baregbeg, Lumbung, Mangunjaya, Purwadadi, Sindangkasih and Sukamantri) had been created between the censuses of 2000 and 2010.

Following the separation of ten districts (Cigugur, Cijulang, Cimerak, Kalipucang, Langkaplancar, Mangunjaya, Padaherang, Pangandaran, Parigi and Sidamulih) to form the new Pangandaran Regency, the remaining Ciamis Regency was divided into 26 districts (kecamatan), but an additional district (Banjaranyar) was subsequently created by splitting of Banjarsari District. The 27 districts are tabulated below with their areas and their 2010 and 2020 census populations, together with the official estimates as at mid 2021. The table includes the number of villages (258 rural desa and 7 urban kelurahan - the latter all in Ciamis Town District) in each district, and its post code.

The first seven of the districts listed below, with a combined area of 508.49 km2 and 359,293 inhabitants in mid 2021, lie south and west of Banjar city, whose area nearly separates these southern districts from the rest of the regency to the north.

Note: (a) the population of what is now Banjaranyar District in 2010 was included with the figure for Banjarsari District, from which it was subsequently separated.

Gallery

References